Axel Bachmann Schiavo (born 4 November 1989) is a Paraguayan chess player who holds the Grandmaster title.

Biography 
Bachmann went to study to the University of Texas at Brownsville on a chess scholarship due to a recommendation by Peruvian grandmaster Daniel Fernandez. There, Bachmann was a teammate and training partner of Chilean grandmaster Mauricio Flores Ríos.

Bachmann won the 5th Iberoamerican Chess Championship held in Linares, Jaén, Spain in 2014.

Career
Bachmann won, or tied for first, the following tournaments:
 Pan American Under-16 Championship in Camboriú, Brazil (2005)
 Magistral Mercosur (2007)
 Rochefort International Chess Festival (2014)
 30th Cappelle-la-Grande Open (2014)
 Iași International Chess Festival (2014) 
 Golden Sands Open (2014)
 World Open 2015
 Magistral Ciutat de Barcelona 2015

Bachmann played for Paraguay in the Chess Olympiads:
 of 2004 in Calvià, on the second board (+5 -5 =2)
 of 2006 in Turin, on board three (+6 -2 =4)
 of 2008 in Dresden, on  the first board (+4 -4 =2)
 of 2012 in Istanbul, on board one (+5 -3 =2)
 of 2014 in Tromsø, on the top board  (+2 -3 =4)

Notable games
Andrey Vovk vs Axel Bachmann, 2014, Spanish Game: Morphy Defense (C78), 0-1

References

External links 
Axel Bachmann chess games at 365Chess.com

1989 births
Living people
Chess grandmasters
Paraguayan chess players
Sportspeople from Ciudad del Este
21st-century Paraguayan people